Armenian patriarch is a term that may be used to describe:

Legendary Armenian figures
 Hayk, legendary patriarch and founder of the Armenian nation
 Aram, a descendant of Hayk, from whom the name of Armenia may derive
 History of Armenia, an early account of Armenia, lists Armenian patriarchs according to Moses
Ara the Handsome, legendary Armenian hero and king

Patriarchs (catholicoses) of the Armenian Church
List of catholicoi of all Armenians
List of Armenian patriarchs of Constantinople
List of Armenian Catholic patriarchs of Cilicia
List of Armenian catholicoi of Cilicia
List of Armenian patriarchs of Jerusalem

See also
History of Armenia
Aram (given name)
Vahagn, a god of fire, thunder, and war worshiped in ancient Armenia

Catholicoi of Armenia
Lists of patriarchs
Lists of Armenian people